Weavers, widowbirds, and allies form the family Ploceidae. The International Ornithological Committee (IOC) recognizes these 122 species; 67 of them are in genus Ploceus and the rest are distributed among 14 other genera. 

This list is presented according to the IOC taxonomic sequence and can also be sorted alphabetically by common name and binomial.

References

P
Ploceidae